The 2017 Western Balkans Summit in Trieste, Italy was the fourth annual summit within the Berlin Process initiative for European integration of Western Balkans states. Previous summits took place in Berlin in 2014,  Vienna in 2015 and in Paris in 2016.  Heads of government, foreign ministers and the ministers of economy of Albania, Bosnia and Herzegovina, Kosovo, Republic of Macedonia, Montenegro, Serbia, as well as EU member states from the region Croatia, Slovenia and EU member states Austria, France, Germany, Italy as well as representatives of the European Union and the International Financial Institutions attended.
Participants once again committed the Western Balkan's eventual path into the EU and agreed the next Berlin Process Summit would take place in London.

Agenda
Issues discussed during the summit included laying the foundations for a common Balkan market, increasing regional cooperation, improving and expanding infrastructure and energy services, curbing migration, and fighting corruption, terrorism, and radicalism. Plans drawn up during the summit included a Connectivity Agenda, a regional economic integration plan, private sector development, and expanding people-to-people contacts. Investments totaling greater than 500 million euros from the European Investment Bank and the European Bank for Reconstruction and Development were agreed upon by the participants. The talks of Germany and the EU funding infrastructure and rebuilding less-developed areas in the region has been compared to The Marshall Plan, being dubbed The Balkan Marshall Plan.

Connectivity
Infrastructure is slated to be harmonized and built with EU regulations within the region, alongside repairs and updates to existing infrastructure.

Regional Economic Integration
The foundations for a common Balkan market were agreed upon. The summit leaders decided to focus on mostly investing in start-ups and scale-ups.  The region also started on the path to integration within the pan-European digital market. To help facilitate this process, the Chamber Investment Forum of the Western Balkans was created. Johannes Hahn stated the economic integration and lowering of tariffs could produce up to 80,000 jobs.

People-to-People Contacts
Balkan and EU leaders agreed to extend the Erasmus Exchange Programme to the Balkans as well as organising an EU-Western Balkans Youth Forum.

Notes and references
Notes:

References:

See also
Berlin Process
Southeast Europe
Stabilisation and Association Process
Central European Free Trade Agreement
Stability Pact for South Eastern Europe
Southeast Europe Transport Community

2017 in politics
Diplomatic conferences in Italy
21st-century diplomatic conferences (Europe)
2017 in international relations
2017 conferences
Foreign relations of Croatia
Foreign relations of Albania
Foreign relations of Bosnia and Herzegovina
Foreign relations of Kosovo
Foreign relations of North Macedonia
Foreign relations of Montenegro
Foreign relations of Serbia
Foreign relations of Slovenia
International relations in Southeastern Europe
Contemplated enlargements of the European Union
July 2017 events in Italy